Kannana Kanne was a 2020-2023 Indian Tamil-language soap opera that aired on Sun TV from 2 November 2020 and ended on 4th March 2023 with starring Nimeshika Radhakrishnan with, Babloo Prithiveeraj and Rahul Ravi in the principal roles. The serial is a remake of Telugu television series Pournami that aired on Gemini TV.

Plot
Gautam and Kausalya live a happy married life but, after ten years, they have no child. One day, Kausalya gets pregnant, but she learns that she is having complications. Gautam, who is not aware of Kausalya having complications, learns of it when Kausalya's doctor says to him in Kausalya's Baby Shower function. Gautum refuses to grow the baby but Kausalya does not listens to Gautum. But she died during the birth of her daughter. Gautam doesn't accept his wife death. So he starts blaming and hating the child. But his mother raised the child and named her Meera.

After two to three years he meets a poor woman named Chithoor Chitra in a temple. Her mother is ill and needs a huge amount of money for her mother's operation. Her mother's brother Rangareddy, who is a greedy, careless about his family. He suggests Chitra to ask a rich babu who lives in their area. When the babu sees Chitra, he was drawn towards her. He decided to give her as much money as she wanted only if she stays with him for one day. The rich Babu asks Rangareddy to bring Chitra. He happily  goes to Chitra to say about the Babu's decision. First she disagrees but later accepts for her mother. The Babu first gave her the money. Chitra asks her friend to go and pay the money in the counter. She goes to the Babu's house. While this happens, Gautum who is still in the temple with his mother. He plans to abandon the baby. So Gautam  asks her mother to go the temple gate to pray the lord and asks to give Meera. She happily gives Meera to Gautam unaware of Gautam's plan and thought that he accepted Meera as his daughter. While she goes to the lord, Gautam drops Meera into a truck which runs to the rich Babu's house. Gautam's mother sees it and she yelled at Gautam and started running towards the truck. When the truck reaches the Babu's house. The little Meera gets down from the truck and enters a room where the Babu brings Chitra forcefully . When little Meera sees Chitra and started calling her "amma" (Tamil word for mother). When Gautam reaches the babu's house the babu starts hitting Meera's grandmother, Gautam starts hitting him. Seeing this, the area president decides to marry Gautam and Chitra. With no choice, they marry each other and live happily afterwards.

20 years later 

Meera, a beautiful and well-raised woman, is now grown up. But till now, her father Gautam hates and blames her for his first wife's death. Meera lives in a house with her grandmother, stepmother and half-sister, who try their best to reunite Meera and her father. Meera craves the love and attention from her father.

Meera falls in love with Yuva but hides her feelings to her family due to her father's hatred. Situations lead to her half-sister getting engaged to Yuva. She obeying her father's wishes and asks Yuva to forget her. Yuva unwillingly agrees to the wedding. Yuva's father's sister, Renuka, is desperate to get yuva married to her daughter Aparna. Aparna, who is aware of Yuva and Meera's love, tries to unite them with her mother's crooked plans to get her and Yuva married. On the wedding day, half-sister Preethi claims that she's in love with Santhosh and will not marry Yuva. Meera's stepmother and her aunt Vasuki plan for her to marry Yuva and convince everyone to agree. Meera's father agrees and the wedding happens. Happily married Yuva and Meera go to Yuva's house but Yuva's father does not accept their marriage, as he cared about money and believed that Meera wouldn’t get any of her father’s inheritance . He throws them out of the house. Then Yamuna, Meera's stepmother, takes her to her house then Gautam starts to hate Preethi and Yamuna as Gauthum feels that they were disloyal to him. Meera then finds out that Preethi does not love Santhosh and made it an act just so Meera and Yuva can get married. Meera decides to unite Preethi and Santosh aware of Santosh's good deeds with Yamuna. Later, Gauthum invites Santhosh to his home to make a deal of leaving Preethi for a large amount of money. But Santhosh wins Gauthum's heart and Gauthum accepts Santhosh and Preethi's love. However it is then revealed that Santhosh is in fact evil and is the nephew of Gautam's enemy Menaka, who plans on ruining the family once Preethi marries Santhosh of this. Meera tries her best to stop the wedding but fails. Gautam is shocked to discover Santhosh's real identity. Menaka demands Gautam to write all of his wealth in Santosh's name for Preethi and Santhosh to live happily together. Gautam does so and is forced to leave the house alongside Meera and the rest his family.

As Gautam's family enters poverty, the family settles in a home and starts a canteen business, which becomes immensely successful. Preethi learns of her family's poor financial condition one day and leaves Santosh's house to stay with her own family. The story now follows the how Meera and Yuva will restore their family to their original status amidst Menaka's attempts to stop them and Meera's slow but ever growing bond with her father Gautam.

Cast

Lead 
 Nimeshika Radhakrishnan as Meera: Gautham and Kaushalya's daughter; Yamuna's step-daughter; Preethi's half-sister; Yuva's wife
 Rahul Ravi as Yuvaraja aka Yuva: Pushpa and Kodeeswaran's son; Aparna's cousin; Preethi's ex-love interest; Meera's husband
 Babloo Prithiveeraj as Gauthamkrishna aka Gautham: Dhanalakshmi's son; Kaushalya's widower;  Yamuna's husband; Meera and Preethi's father; Menaka’s arch-rival

Supporting 
 Nithya Das (2020-2022) as Yamuna: Chitoor Saroja's daughter; Gautham's second wife; Preethi's mother; Meera's step-mother
 Vinodhini (2022-2023) as Yamuna (Replacement of Das)
 Akshitha Bopaiah as Preethi: Gautham and Yamuna's daughter; Meera's half-sister; Santhosh's wife 
 Maanas Chavali as Santoshkumar aka Santhosh: Menaka's nephew; Swapna's cousin; Preeti's husband
 Sulakshana as Dhanalakshmi: Gautham's mother; Meera and Preethi's grandmother 
 Priya Prince as Menaka: Maragatham's daughter; Swapna's mother; Gautham's arch-rival
 Ineya as Kausalya: Kamala's elder daughter; Vasuki's sister; Gautham's first wife; Meera's mother (Deceased) 
 Fouzil Hidhayah as Swapna: Menaka's daughter; Santhosh's cousin
 Swathi Thara as Deepika: Yuva's MD
 Geetha Ravishanker as Maragatham: Menaka's mother; Santosh and Swapna's grandmother
 Nithya Ravindran / Uma Rani / Shanthi Anandraj as Pushpa: Kodeeshwaran's wife; Yuva's mother 
 Shanthi Arvind as Renuka: Kodeeshwaran's sister; Aparna's mother
 J. Livingston as Kodeeshwaran: Renuka's brother; Pushpa's husband; Yuva's father 
 Sahana Shetty as Aparna: Renuka's daughter; Yuva's cousin
 Preethi Sanjiv as Vasuki: Kamala's younger daughter; Kausalya's sister (Deceased) 
 Anuradha as Kamala: Kaushalya and Vasuki's mother; Meera's grandmother (Deceased) 
 Geetha Narayan as Nallamangai: a lawyer
 Singapore Deepan as Spot payment Singaram
 Sidharth Kapilavayi as Karuna: Kulandaivelu's brother
 NS Madeshwaran as Kulandaivelu: Financier; Karuna's elder brother
 Pondy Ravi as Harichandran
 Saakshi Siva as Kishore
 Sachana as Madhumati: Kishore’s daughter 
 Varshini Venkat as Inspector Poonguzhali
 Nikhil as Anbu a.k.a. Dhoni: Yuva's adoptive brother
 Manoj Kumar as Veeraian: Vasuki's helper
 Ashok Kumar as Jeeva: Yuva's best friend
 Ashwini Selvam as Roshana: Yuva's best friend 
 Devi Teju as Soorna: Chitra's aunt
 Jayakumar as Rangareddy: Chitra's uncle
 Balaji as Babu: Menaka's helper
 Subha geetha as Kavitha

Special appearance 
 Robo Shankar as Shankar: Gautam's best friend in Preeti's birthday celebration 
 Indraja Shankar as Indraja: Shankar's daughter in Preeti's birthday celebration 
 Divya Sridhar as Bharathi: In Preethi's birthday
 Priyanka Nalkari as Roja Arjun: In Mahasangamam, from Roja serial
 Sibbu Suryan as Arjun Prathap: In Mahasangamam, from Roja serial
 Krishna Raghunandan as Vijay: Yuva's friend in Preeti and Yuva's marriage celebration
 Shruthi Raj as Isai: Meera's friend in Preeti and Yuva's marriage celebration
 Riyaz Khan as Dharmadurai: Meera's uncle Preeti and Yuva's marriage celebration
 Ganesh Venkataraman as Assistant Commissioner Dinesh: Gautam's friend in Preeti and Yuva's marriage celebration
 Nandan Loganathan as Kavin: Gautam's friend; Mallika Devi's son in Preeti and Yuva's marriage celebration
 Preethi Sharma as Venba: Kavin's wife in Preeti and Yuva's marriage celebration
 Kiruba as Chitoor Saroja: Yamuna's mother; Preethi's grandmother (Dead)
 Sakshi Agarwal as Herself: Guest in Kousalya's birthday celebration

Adaptations

Soundtrack

The titular soundtrack, named Kannana Kanne, was sung by Carnatic musician K. S. Chitra. The song's music and background score was composed by Sam C. S.

References

External links
 
 Kannana Kanne at Sun NXT

Sun TV original programming
Tamil-language romance television series
Tamil-language melodrama television series
2020 Tamil-language television series debuts
Tamil-language television shows
Television shows set in Tamil Nadu
2023 Tamil-language television series endings
Tamil-language television series based on Telugu-language television series